Peter Jackson is an Australian writer and scholar of Buddhism and gender and sexual identities in Thailand. He completed his PhD in Philosophy and Asian Studies at the Australian National University, Canberra in 1986. His PhD dissertation, which is published under the title Buddhadasa: A Buddhist Thinker for the Modern World (1988) reflects his interests in the Thai language, the role of Buddhist thought, and the institution of the sangha in modern Thailand.

Jackson was a Senior Project Officer for the Thai National Curriculum and Materials with the Australian Capital Territory Schools Authority. He is currently a Professor of Thai history in the School of Culture, History and Language, at the Australian National University.

Bibliography
A Topic Index of the Sutta Pitaka (Thai: Datchanii Sap Thamma Nai Phra Suttantapidok), Chulalongkorn University Press, Bangkok, 1986. (189 pages) 
Buddhadasa: A Buddhist Thinker for the Modern World, The Siam Society, Bangkok, 1988. (354 pages, publication of revised version of doctoral dissertation)
Male Homosexuality in Thailand: An Interpretation of Contemporary Thai Sources, Global Academic Publishers, New York, 1989 (285 pages) 
Buddhism, Legitimation and Conflict: The Political Functions of Urban Thai Buddhism, Institute of Southeast Asian Studies, Singapore, 1989. (245 pages) 
Dear Uncle Go: Male Homosexuality in Thailand, Bua Luang Books, Bangkok, 1995. (310 pages) .
Buddhadasa: Theravada Buddhism and Modernist Reform in Thailand, Silkworm Books, Chiang Mai, 2003.  (A fully revised version of the 1988 monograph listed above, including a new epilogue).

References

External links
 Academic biography.

Australian scholars
Living people
Place of birth missing (living people)
Year of birth missing (living people)
Australian writers